Major-General Allan Elton Younger DSO OBE (Tony Younger, 4 May 1919 – 5 July 2010) was a British soldier and author, Colonel Commandant of the Royal Engineers from 1974 to 1979.

Background
Younger's family has a long military tradition. His father was Brigadier Arthur Allan Shakespear Younger, and his grandfather was Colonel John Younger, Royal Artillery.  He was a maternal first cousin of Dad’s army actor, John Le Mesurier Halliley.  Younger belonged to a branch of the Younger Brewery family of Edinburgh, founded by his 3x great-grandfather William Younger (1733-1769).

Education
He was educated at Gresham's School, Holt, the Royal Military Academy, Woolwich, and Christ's College, Cambridge.

Career
He was commissioned into the Royal Engineers in 1939 and saw active service in World War II, taking part in the Dunkirk evacuation, the Normandy landings, then later in the Korean War.

In 1942, he took part in trials on the Scottish island of Gruinard to test the potential of anthrax as a weapon. He later said that its lethality compared with chemical weapons was like the difference between TNT and a nuclear bomb.

He served in Burma, 1946–1947, Malaya, 1948, and Korea, 1950–1951. At the start of the Korean War, Younger was given command of 55 Field Squadron, Royal Engineers.

From 1954 to 1957, he taught at Sandhurst, and from 1960 to 1962 commanded 36 Corps Engineer Regiment in the UK and Kenya.

He went on to become the Senior Army Member of the Directing Staff at the Royal College of Defence Studies from 1972 to 1975 and Colonel Commandant of the Royal Engineers between 1974 and 1979.

Autobiography
Blowing Our Bridges: A Memoir from Dunkirk to Korea via Normandy (Leo Cooper Ltd, 2004)

Honours
Officer of the Order of the British Empire, 1969
Distinguished Service Order
Silver Star (U.S. decoration) 1952
Colonel Commandant, Corps of Royal Engineers, 15 April 1974

References

Who's Who 2003 (A. & C. Black, London, 2003) page 2408
Korean War Medals
Corps of Royal Engineers
Blowing Our Bridges at amazon.com

Kandyan Chiefs

External links
 Imperial War Museum Interview

1919 births
2010 deaths
People educated at Gresham's School
Alumni of Christ's College, Cambridge
Graduates of the Royal Military Academy, Woolwich
Royal Engineers officers
British Army generals
British Army personnel of World War II
Officers of the Order of the British Empire
Companions of the Distinguished Service Order
Foreign recipients of the Silver Star
British Army personnel of the Korean War
Academics of the Royal Military Academy Sandhurst
Graduates of the Staff College, Camberley